Orahov Do (Serbian Cyrillic: Орахов До) is a village in Ravno municipality Bosnia and Herzegovina. It was formerly part of the Trebinje municipality, up until the Bosnian War. It is only a few kilometers away from the border with Croatia on the road from the Adriatic coast to Popovo polje. It was the birthplace of Ragusan merchant Nikola Bošković, father of famed astronomer Ruđer Bošković.

Name
The literal translation of Orahov Do is "Walnut Valley". Other variants include Orahovi Do, Orovi Do, and Orahovo. In Serbian Cyrillic, the name is written as "Орахов До".

History
In Dubrovnik court file from 1284 with name Orahovec(Oraxouech) is mentioned village of Orahovi Do.
The village is mentioned in Ragusan documents dating to July 1405 (as Horachindol), 1408 (as Orachouo dol) and 1414 (as Oracouodol). The 1405 document mentions Novak Grgurić as a subject of vojvoda Sandalj Hranić. The 1408 document mentions nobleman Pokrajac Novaković's granting his subject Novak Grgurić from Orahov Do to settle with his family in the Ston region. The 1414 document mentions Radonja Pripković from the village. The region was during the Middle Ages part of the župa (county) of Popovo. The village is 1475 called Rahov Do and is inhabited with 23 families. Village was burned  by the Ottomans in 1687, and  1692 during the mass Don Ilija Bošković uncle of Ruđer Bošković was killed by Uskoks. In 1624 list of Fr. Blaz Gračanin mentions in village 19 Catholic houses and about 100 Catholics, 1639 in the list of Fr. Dominik Andrijasević  village has 14 Catholic families. According to the Austro-Hungarian Census from 1879 in Orahov Dol lived only Catholics.

During the Great Turkish War in 1689, Hajduks attacked Orahov Do, Nijev Do and Balenići on the order of serdar Nonković.

Demographics
The village is inhabited by a Croat majority and Serb minority. In the 1991 census, the village had 42 residents, including:
38 (90.47%) Croats
4 (9.52%) Serbs

According to the 2013 census, its population was 151, all Croats.

Anthropology
Surnames found in the village include Burum, Kristić, Đurinov, Čupović, Bjelanov, Delić, Zurević, Cajin, Pirijač, Kićunov, and others.

According to Serbian sources, the Bošković brotherhood (ancestors of Roger Joseph Boscovich), originally surnamed Pokrajčić, had settled the village from the surrounding mountains. Branches of the brotherhood also settled the surroundings of Stolac.

Notable people
Dominik Andrijašević (1572–1639), Ragusan Franciscan bishop
Benedikt Orsini (fl. 1629–1637), Ragusan Franciscan bishop
Nikola Bošković (1642–1721), Ragusan trader and father of Roger Joseph Boscovich

References

Sources

Populated places in Ravno, Bosnia and Herzegovina
Croat communities in Bosnia and Herzegovina